Zion Township may refer to the following townships in the United States:

 Zion Township, Stearns County, Minnesota
 Zion Township, Lake County, Illinois

See also
 Mount Zion Township, Macon County, Illinois